Finstergrün Castle is a castle in the state of Salzburg, Austria. The castle is believed to have been built in1296/97 by Rudolf von Fohnsdorf. In 1300 it was described as “a border fortress” between the Archbishopric of Salzburg and the Duchy of Styria. During the 14th and 15th centuries it became the seat of the administrator who was in charge of managing the silver mines in Ramingstein. The first documented mention of the name Burg Finstergruen (dark ditch) occurred in 1629.

In 1841 the castle complex was destroyed by a forest fire. In 1899 a new owner, Count Sándor Szapary, bought the castle and rebuilt a comfortable house from the ruins. It was later inherited by his son. In the 1930s and 1940s the castle belonged to Countess Szapary, who took in selected paying guests.

After the Second World War, Burg Finstergrün became a centre of the activities of the Evangelical Youth movement.

See also
List of castles in Austria

References

This article was initially translated from the German Wikipedia.

External links
 Official website

Castles in Salzburg (state)
Jugendburg